FSA may refer to:

Organizations

Government
 Federal Security Agency, a US government entity from 1939 to 1953
 Family Support Administration, now part of the US Department of Health and Human Services
 Farm Security Administration, now the Farmers Home Administration in the US
 Farm Service Agency, part of the US Department of Agriculture
 Food Science Australia, now known as the CSIRO Division of Food and Nutritional Science
 Food Standards Agency, a British regulator
 Federal Student Aid, an office of the US Department of Education
 Federation of South Arabia, now part of Yemen
 Freedom Support Act, a 1992 US law

Financial regulators
 Financial Services Agency, for Japan
 Financial Services Authority, formerly for the UK
 Financial Services Authority (Isle of Man)
 Financial Supervisory Authority (Sweden)

Education
 Flint Southwestern Academy, in Michigan, US
 Florida Student Association
 Foreign Service Academy, in Pakistan

Professional titles and associations
 Fellow of the Society of Actuaries, in North America
 Fellow of the Society of Antiquaries of London 
 Fellow of the Society of Antiquaries of Scotland, normally given as "FSA Scot"
 Florida Sheriffs Association, a non-profit professional association
 Fire & Security Association, in London
 Fire Safety Assessor, in New South Wales, Australia

Sport
 FC FSA Voronezh, a Russian football club
 Federation of Sports Arenas, the former name of the Premier Arena Soccer League
 Football South Australia, the governing body of association football in South Australia
 Football Supporters' Association, the national organisation for football supporters in England and Wales
 Salvadorian Athletics Federation
 Saxony-Anhalt Football Association

Other organizations
 Financial Security Assurance, an American insurance company
 FSA Corporation, now part of the Canadian computer company McAfee Associates
 Fran Silvestre Arquitectos, a studio based in Valencia
 Free Spirit Alliance, an American non-profit organization serving the Pagan and Pantheist communities
 Free Syrian Army, an opposition army group
 Maghaweir al-Thowra, a Free Syrian Army subunit which uses the term to refer specifically to itself.
 Syrian National Army, a group of Free Syrian Army subunits which sometimes use the term to refer to their formation specifically.

Finance
 Financial statement analysis
 Financial Services Act (disambiguation)
 Flexible spending account

Science and technology
 Fast statistical alignment
 Finite-state automaton
 Forward scattering alignment

Other uses
 Fire Services Act (disambiguation)
 Flying Saucer Attack, an English rock band
 Forward Sortation Area, part of a Canadian postal code

See also
 Financial Supervisory Authority (disambiguation)